Neeyum Njanum  ( You and Me) is an Indian Malayalam-language television series which premiered on 10 February 2020 on Zee Keralam and streams on ZEE5. South Indian actor Shiju plays the lead protagonist alongside debutante Susmitha Prabhakaran. The series is an official remake of Zee Marathi series Tula Pahate Re.

Plot 
The story started from a famous 45 year old business man Ravi Chandra Varman (Shiju Abdul Rasheed), the MD of Varman group and Sree Lakshmi a 23 years old college student (Susmitha Prabhakaran) who is kind hearted by nature. One day in Sree Lakshmi's college function Ravi Varman was invited as the chief guest. Sree Lakshmi was the announcer of the function. Sree Lakshmi goes to the college by an auto, Ravi Varman avoid his luxury car and goes on a cycle. Ravi's cycle was broken and Sree and Ravi travel in the same autorickshaw. Ravi likes Sree Lakshmi's attitude which attracts him towards Sree. Ravi Varman announced Sree as the staff in Varman group which is not liked by the Vice president of Varman group Sandra (Sree Lakshmi's senior) (Lekshmy Nandan) as she have an affection towards Ravivarman and due to the reason that Sree works efficiently than Sandra which impresses Ravivarman. Slowly Ravi and Sree get close. Ravi have a special interest towards Sree. This is not supported by Rajaram, his best friend (also PA of Ravi Varman)
because he felt that their age gap might be a problem between their relationship. Due to this, Ravi acts strict towards Sree which initially surprises Sree. Later Sree Lakshmi becomes the senior of Rajanandhini fabrics. Slowly Raja Ram supports their crush but unfortunately her parents fix her marriage with the neighbour's son which she reluctantly agrees. Ravivarman goes to help Sree's family for the wedding with the intention of meeting Sree Lakshmi. The marriage gets called off due to rivalry between neighbour and Sree's father. Their bond gets closer which creates a ruckus in the office by Sandra. By convincing her parents and his parents, they get married. Sree asks about Rajanandini but Ravi ignores it leading to her getting doubts. Sree gets possessed by a ghost in the midnight who introduced herself as Rajanandini (Kalyani Nair), the deceased wife of Ravivarman. She reveals that she was not dead by an accident but killed by Ravivarman who wanted to take possession on Rajanandini's business enterprise. She also reveals that Sree is none other than Rajanandini's rebirth whose aim is to kill Ravivarman.

Cast

Main
 Shiju Abdul Rasheed as Ravichandra Varman (Sanjay)
(M.D of Varman group, son of Gayatridevi, brother of Raghuchandra Varman, and Sreelakshmi's husband)
 Susmitha Prabhakaran  as Sreelakshmi Ravichandra Varman / Hasthinapuri Kannamma
(Daughter of Sarojamma and Sudarshan, Krishna's friend, and Ravi Varman's wife
 Bold and self centred girl from a village, younger sister or Devi

Recurring
Kalyani Nair as Rajanandhini 
(Ravi Varman's first wife, Gayatridevi's daughter. Reghu Varman's elder sister and ex MD of Varman group)
Lekshmy Nandan as Sandra
(Varman group's vice president,  Ravichandra Varman's PA and wishes to marry him.)
Remya Sudha as Sarojamma 
(Sree Lakshmi's mother, Sudharshan's wife)
James as Sudarsan
(Sreelakshmi's father and Sarojamma's husband)
Abees Saif as Raja Ram
(PA of Varman Group and Ravichandra Varman's best friend)
Nisthar Sait as Gowri Das/GD
(Rajanandhini's old business partner and Ravi Varman's enemy)
Athira Praveen as Krishna
(Puppy's daughter, Sreelakshmi's best friend)
Manka Mahesh/ Shobha Mohan as Gayatri Devi
(Wife of late.Raja Raja Varma , mother of Ravichandra and Reghuchandra Varmanand sreelakshmi,Rekha's mother in law)
Kiran Iyer as Raghuchandra Varman
(Younger brother of Ravichandra, son of Gayathri Devi and husband of Rekha)
Pratheeksha G Pradeep as Rekha
(Reghuchandra Varman's wife, Ravichandravarman's sister in law, and Gayatridevi's daughter in law )
Akhil Chithrangathan as Deepu Sandeep
(Trivikraman's son, Krishna's cousin and Sree Lekshmi's friend)
Sopna Mohan as Padmini/Puppy.
sarojamma's friend and neighbor, krishna's mother, Trivikaman's sister
Suresh Nair as Trivikraman 
Padmini's brother, Deepu's father and Krishna's uncle.
Gopika as Maya 
(Sarojamma's elder sister's daughter,
and Sree Lakshmi's cousin)
Raji Menon as Sree Lakshmi
(Sachi's mother and rtd Mathematics teacher)
Akash Murali as Sachidananthan/Sachi
Sreelakshmi's ex-fiancée
Anand as Rahul
(Office Staff)
Jayaram Kalakkodu as Najeeb
(Attender)
Sayana Krishna as Ragasudha
( Daughter of neelambari and Raja Raja Varma, step sister or Ravi and Raghu)
Kezia Joseph as Devi
Blind sister of Kannamma
Nandhan Senanipuram as prasad (kochu thirumeni)

Guest appearance
Divya Unni
Prabhin
Mersheena Neenu
Vaishnavi Saikumar
Sharan Puthumana
Mariya Prince

Adaptations

References

External links 

 Neeyum Njanum at Zee5
 

Malayalam-language television shows
2020 Indian television series debuts
Zee Keralam original programming